Richard Osborn was the 20th President of Pacific Union College. He took office in 2001, serving until he resigned in 2009. Previously, he also served as President of the Council for American Private Education, a coalition representing 80% of private schools in the United States. Osborn is the former principal of Takoma Academy and former Education director of Columbia Union Conference. Osborn is the founder of the Association of Adventist Colleges and Universities. He is the former Vice-President for Education for the North American Division. Osborn is the current chairman of the Association of Independent California Colleges and Universities, a voice for private higher education in California. And he is also Vice-President of the Western Association of Schools and Colleges.

References

Pacific Union College presidents
Living people
American educators
American Seventh-day Adventists
University of Maryland, College Park alumni
Osborn, Richard (Dick)